Wild Country may refer to:

Wild Country (1947 film), an American film directed by Ray Taylor
Wild Country (2005 film), a 2005 low budget British horror film
Wild Wild Country, a 2018 Netflix documentary series about the Rajneesh movement
Wild Country (company), a manufacturer of climbing equipment